Green Bay Pluit is a mixed development complex with an area of about 12.5 hectares (31 acres), located at Pluit in North Jakarta, Indonesia. This super-block is built on the seafront, which has a Mall, 12 towers of apartment and condominium. It has a botanical garden of 3 hectares (7.4 acres) area & water sports recreation facilities. Green Bay Pluit is developed by Agung Podomoro Land.

Sea View Condominium has four towers, named as J, K, L and M. Bay View Apartment has 4 towers of E, F, G and H. Coast View Apartment has 4 towers known as A, B, C and D.

Bay Walk Mall 

Bay Walk Mall is part of this complex, which is spread over lower 6 floors with 55,000 square meters floor space & has about 250 stores. From the Bandar Djakarta restaurant in the Bay Walk Mall, Apartemen Pantai Mutiara, Marina Condominium, and Regatta complex is visible.

The shopping mall comprises six floors and a basement, which contains a parking lot. The basement houses Bay Walk Tunnel, which contains additional tenants and a water feature. There are two gardens accessible through the tunnel which also has parking space. There is also indoor parking connected to the main mall. Behind the main building is a waterfront where the nearby beach, Pantai Mutiara, can be seen.

See also

 List of tallest buildings in Jakarta
List of shopping malls in Jakarta

References

External links
 

Buildings and structures in Jakarta
Post-independence architecture of Indonesia
Residential skyscrapers in Indonesia
Skyscrapers in Indonesia
North Jakarta